Acontias occidentalis, the western burrowing skink or savanna legless skink,  is a species of lizard in the family Scincidae. It is found in Namibia, Zimbabwe, Angola, and South Africa.

References

Acontias
Reptiles described in 1941
Taxa named by Vivian Frederick Maynard FitzSimons